Palmerston County is one of the five counties in the Northern Territory of Australia which are part of the Lands administrative divisions of Australia. It contains the city of Darwin. It was proclaimed on 14 September 1871 and divided into hundreds. Being on the northern coast of the territory, it is bounded on the north and west by sea, the Adelaide River on the east and on the south by a line at longitude approximately 13°15' south (from a point adjacent to the southernmost of the Peron Islands to the township of Adelaide River).

Hundreds

References

Counties of the Northern Territory